Benjamin Bowling  is Professor of Criminology & Criminal Justice at King's College London, an author and an honorary psychotherapist. He is a recipient of the Radzinowicz Memorial Prize awarded for the best article in the British Journal of Criminology in 1999. Bowling was elected Fellow of the British Academy in 2022.

Early life and education
Bowling is the son of the artists Frank Bowling and Claire Spencer. He has a Bachelor of Arts degree in Psychology from Manchester Metropolitan University and a PhD from the London School of Economics. He has a Master of Science degree in Psychodynamic Counselling and Psychotherapy from Birkbeck College.

Career and research
After working at the Home Office Research Unit Bowling moved to the City University of New York and taught at the John Jay College of Criminal Justice before returning to Britain where he became  a lecturer in criminology at the University of Cambridge in 1996.

He joined King's as a lecturer in law in 1999 and has been a visiting professor at the University of the West Indies, at Monash University and at the East China University of Political Science and Law.

Bowling's research examines practical, political and legal problems in policing and the connections between local and global police power. His work exploring central themes of fairness, effectiveness and accountability has been published in three books: 
 Policing the Caribbean (Oxford University Press 2010) 
Global Policing (with James Sheptycki, SAGE Publishing 2012) 
 Stop and Search: Police Power in Global Context (edited with Leanne Weber, Routledge 2012) 

in 2012 Bowling published (with James Sheptycki) a co-edited four-volume major work for SAGE Publishing on Global Policing and Transnational Law Enforcement. He has published numerous articles in the Modern Law Review, Criminal Law Review, Policing and Society and Theoretical Criminology.

Bowling's studies of Violent Racism (Oxford University Press 1998) and Racism, Crime and Justice (with Coretta Phillips, Longman 2002) are the standard works on these subjects.

Public engagement 

Bowling submitted evidence to the Stephen Lawrence Inquiry in 1999 and has been a specialist adviser to the House of Commons, Home Affairs Committee, the Foreign and Commonwealth Office, the Equality and Human Rights Commission, the European Commission, Interpol and the United Nations.

He is a founding member of StopWatch, a charity that works to inform the public about the police's use of Stop and Search powers in the UK and to promote fair, effective and accountable policing. Bowling has appeared in the media commenting on stop and search and criminal justice.

Psychotherapy 

Bowling is an honorary psychotherapist with the Central and North West London NHS Foundation Trust. He has an MSc in Psychodynamic Counselling and Psychotherapy from Birkbeck College and is a member of British Association for Counselling and Psychotherapy.

Awards and honours 

Bowling is a recipient of the Radzinowicz Memorial Prize awarded for the best article in the British Journal of Criminology in 1999. He was elected a Fellow of the Academy of Social Sciences in 2005 and a Fellow of the British Academy in 2022.

Publications 
Bowling's publications include:
 Young People and Crime (with John Graham; Home Office 1995) 
 Violent Racism (Oxford University Press 1999) 
 Racism, Crime and Justice (with Coretta Phillips: Longman criminology series, Pearson Education 2002) 
 Policing the Caribbean (Oxford University Press 2010) 
 Global Policing (With James Sheptycki: SAGE Publishing 2012) 
 Stop and Search: Police Power in Global Context (with Leanne Weber, Routledge 2012) 
 Global Policing and Transnational Law Enforcement Volumes 1 – 4 (with James Sheptycki, Sage Library of Criminology, SAGE Publishing 2015)

Personal life 
Bowling is the frontman of the British blues band Doc Bowling and his Blues Professors.

References

External links
Official web page on King's College London website
Doc Bowling and his Blues Professors: Official website
Bowling's Twitter account

1962 births
Living people
Academics of King's College London
Academics of the University of Cambridge
Alumni of Birkbeck, University of London
Alumni of the London School of Economics
Alumni of Manchester Metropolitan University
Black British men
British blues singers
Fellows of the Academy of Social Sciences
Fellows of the British Academy
John Jay College of Criminal Justice alumni